Agrotis brachystria is a species of moth of the family Noctuidae. It is found in Argentina and Rio Grande do Sul in Brasil.

External links
Noctuídeos (Lepidoptera, Noctuidae) coletados em quatro Áreas Estaduaisde Conservação do Rio Grande do Sul, Brasil

Agrotis
Moths of South America
Moths described in 1903